Metni Vrh is a dispersed settlement in the hills north of Sevnica in east-central Slovenia. The area is part of the historical region of Lower Styria. The Municipality of Sevnica is now included in the Lower Sava Statistical Region. 

The local church, built on a small hill just south of the hamlet of Žabjak, is dedicated to Saint Lawrence and belongs to the Parish of Sevnica. It dates to the 17th century with some late 18th-century modifications.

References

External links
Metni Vrh at Geopedia

Populated places in the Municipality of Sevnica